Gustave Reese (29 November 1899 – 7 September 1977) was an American musicologist and teacher.  Reese is known mainly for his work on medieval and Renaissance music, particularly with his two publications Music in the Middle Ages (1940) and Music in the Renaissance (1954); these two books remain the standard reference works for these two eras, with complete and precise bibliographical material, allowing for almost every piece of music mentioned to be traced back to a primary source.

Early life and education
Reese was born in New York City on 29 November 1899. He was an avid scholar and had interests in many areas outside music, including art, architecture, and literature.  He studied law at New York University, graduating in 1921. Though he was admitted to the New York State Bar, he opted to re-enroll and pursue a Bachelor of Music from NYU, which he received in 1930.

Career 
In 1927, however, he was already teaching classes at the university in medieval and Renaissance music.  He continued teaching there intermittently until 1974, and he became Professor Emeritus in 1973.  He also served as a visiting professor at a number of universities, including Harvard, Duke, UCLA, USC, Michigan, Oxford and the Juilliard School of Music. At his death he was still leading doctoral seminars in the Graduate School of the City University of New York. He was a founder-member of the American Musicological Society (AMS) from 1934, serving as its first secretary (1934–1946).  He became vice-president in 1946 and president of the organization in 1950. He has also held positions in the International Musicological Society (IMS), the Renaissance Society of America, and the Plainsong and Medieval Music Society.

Also active in the music publishing industry, he headed the publication department of G. Schirmer (1940–1945) and was also director of publication at Carl Fischer (1945–1955). Furthermore, he was editor of The Musical Quarterly from 1944 to 1945.

Gustave Reese had a profound impact on many generations of music students through his passionate and insightful teaching.  He has left a valuable legacy in Music in the Middle Ages and Music in the Renaissance.  These two pillars have incited a revival of interest and scholarship in the areas of early music.  He is often perceived to have 'raised the bar' of musicological scholarship with his thorough research, intellectual rigour and comprehensive bibliographies.  He commissioned other people to contribute specialist sections to these books, such as Igor Buketoff's piece on Russian chant in Music in the Middle Ages.

Personal life 
Reese married Fine Arts administrator and cookbook author and editor Carol Truax in 1974. He died, aged 77, in Berkeley, California.

Publications

Books
 
 
Fourscore Classics of Music Literature: A Guide to Selected Original Sources on Theory and Other Writings on Music Not Available in English.  New York, Da Capo Press, 1970.

Articles
 
 Reese, Gustave. "Josquin Desprez (biography)" The New Grove Dictionary of Music and Musicians, ed. Stanley Sadie. London, Macmillan, 1980. (20 vol.) .

Others
 
Essays in musicology in honor of Dragan Plamenac on his 70th birthday. Pittsburgh, University of Pittsburgh Press, c1969.  
A compendium of musical practice. New York, Dover Publications, 1973.

References

Sources

Further reading

External links
 
 The Gustave Reese Papers in the Music Division of New York Public Library for the Performing Arts.

1899 births
1977 deaths
Duke University faculty
New York University faculty
People from Berkeley, California
Educators from New York City
20th-century American musicologists
Josquin scholars